Griffonia is a genus of central African flowering plants in the legume family, Fabaceae. It belongs to the subfamily Cercidoideae. Griffonia is known to have a high concentration of 5-HTP in its seeds.

Taxonomy
The genus Griffonia was named by Henri Baillon in honour of his friend and fellow physician Marie-Théophile Griffon du Bellay, explorer of Gabon, pioneer in the study of sleeping sickness and also of the African entheogen Iboga, source of the alkaloid ibogaine.

Species
Griffonia comprises the following species:

 Griffonia physocarpa Baill.
 Griffonia simplicifolia (M.Vahl ex DC.) Baill.
 Griffonia speciosa (Welw. ex Benth.) Taub.
 Griffonia tessmannii (De Wild.) Compère

References

Cercidoideae
Fabaceae genera
Taxa named by Henri Ernest Baillon